Census Division No. 14 (South Interlake) is a census division located within the Interlake Region of the province of Manitoba, Canada. Unlike in some other provinces, census divisions do not reflect the organization of local government in Manitoba. These areas exist solely for the purposes of statistical analysis and presentation; they have no government of their own.

The district is served by the retail service centres of Stonewall and Teulon. The economy of the area is based on agriculture, livestock and poultry. The population of the division was 18,118 as of the 2006 census.

Demographics 

Towns

 Stonewall
 Teulon

Rural municipalities
 Rockwood
 Rosser
 Woodlands

References

External links
 Manitoba Community Profiles: South Interlake

14